Gmina Drelów is a rural gmina (administrative district) in Biała Podlaska County, Lublin Voivodeship, in eastern Poland.

Villages
Gmina Drelów contains the villages and settlements of Aleksandrówka, Danówka, Dołha, Drelów, Kwasówka, Leszczanka, Łózki, Pereszczówka, Przechodzisko, Sokule, Strzyżówka, Szachy, Szóstka, Witoroż, Wólka Łózecka, Worsy, Zahajki and Żerocin.

Neighbouring gminas
Gmina Drelów is bordered by the town of Międzyrzec Podlaski and by the gminas of Biała Podlaska, Kąkolewnica Wschodnia, Komarówka Podlaska, Łomazy, Międzyrzec Podlaski, Radzyń Podlaski and Wohyń.

References

External links
Polish official population figures 2006

Drelow
Biała Podlaska County